How Do You Like My Sister? (French: Comment trouvez-vous ma soeur?) is a 1964 French comedy film directed by Michel Boisrond and starring France Anglade, Jacqueline Maillan and Claude Rich.

The film's sets were designed by the art director Jean Mandaroux.

Synopsis
The older sister of a schoolgirl who faces being expelled tries to extricate her from her problems by pretending to be her mother. However she then falls in love with the teacher.

Cast
 France Anglade as Cécile
 Jacqueline Maillan as Charlotte Varangeot
 Claude Rich as François Lorin
 Michel Serrault as Varangeot
 Dany Robin as Martine Jolivet
 Jacques Charon as Jolivet
 Eddie Constantine as Eddie

References

Bibliography 
Oscherwitz, Dayna & Higgins, Maryellen. The A to Z of French Cinema. Scarecrow Press, 2009.

External links 
 

1964 films
1964 comedy films
French comedy films
1960s French-language films
Films directed by Michel Boisrond
1960s French films

fr:Comment trouvez-vous ma sœur ?